Rear Admiral William Skipsey (died 18 March 1846) was a Royal Navy officer who became commander-in-chief of the Cape of Good Hope Station.

Naval career
Skipsey joined the Royal Navy in August 1769. He saw action at the Battle of Ushant in July 1778 during the Anglo-French War, at the Battle of Dogger Bank in August 1781 during the Fourth Anglo-Dutch War and at the capture of Saint Lucia in 1795 during the French Revolutionary Wars. Promoted to captain in June 1801, he was given command of the third-rate HMS Hector in March 1802, of the fourth-rate HMS Centurion in May 1813 and of the fifth-rate HMS Maidstone in August 1814 before taking command of the fourth-rate HMS Leander in August 1815. He became commander-in-chief of the Cape of Good Hope Station in 1827 before retiring in 1828.

References

Sources

Royal Navy rear admirals
1846 deaths
Royal Navy personnel of the French Revolutionary Wars
Royal Navy personnel of the Fourth Anglo-Dutch War